Gerson da Cunha (16 June 1929 – 7 January 2022) was an Indian advertising professional who was also a stage and film actor, social worker, and author. He headed the Indian market communications agency Lintas and also worked for J. Walter Thompson, and Hindustan Lever in a career spanning 25 years. He worked with UNICEF in Brazil and was awarded the Order of Rio Branco by the government of Brazil in 2018 for his services to that country.

Da Cunha acted in English-language plays and movies such as  Electric Moon (1992), Cotton Mary (1999), Asoka (2001) and Water (2005), among others.

Early life
Gerson da Cunha was born on 16 June 1929 into a Bombay Goan family of Portuguese descent and grew up in the Mazagaon neighborhood of Bombay (now Mumbai). He graduated in science from the University of Bombay studying at St. Xavier's College. He would later describe his college as a 'fussy and priggish Jesuit College'. His uncle was José Gerson da Cunha, physician and historian, who had written one of the first historical works documenting the origins of Bombay, somewhat aptly titled, The Origins of Bombay. Da Cunha Sr. was also the family physician of the Aga Khan.

Career 
Da Cunha started his career as a journalist with Press Trust of India and later worked with Reuters. He also worked during this time with All India Radio. After five years in the news industry, he moved to advertising working with the Indian marketing communications agencies J. Walter Thompson, Lintas and later to Hindustan Lever, working for over 25 years in the advertising industry between 1955 and 1980. The last ten of those years were spent heading Lintas.

He was a writer for The Earth Times, a newspaper for the 1992 Earth Summit which remained in publication through 2003. His column in the newspaper was titled View from the South and highlighted the need for legislation in driving environmental actions. He also worked with the United Nations Children's Fund (UNICEF) in Latin America and later at its headquarters in New York City.  He worked on social marketing programs focused on nutrition, health, and wellness in the region, including vaccinations in Brazil's favelas and healthy motherhood initiatives in the Central American regions. Da Cunha was awarded the Order of Rio Branco by the government of Brazil in 2018 for his services to that country.

Da Cunha was the founder and CEO of the Mumbai-based NGO and citizens initiative Mumbai First and was also part of its organizing board. He was also active in various other NGOs and citizen groups in Mumbai. He was a trustee of NAGAR and convenor of AGNI (Action for Good Governance and Networking for India). He also worked as an advisor to various Indian union ministries and the National Technology Missions under the Cabinet Secretariat.

Da Cunha had also acted in English-language plays and movies including Electric Moon (1992), Cotton Mary (1999), Asoka (2001) and Water (2005), among others. Some of his notable theater performances included Othello directed by Zul Velani in 1956 and Begum Sumroo directed by Alyque Padamsee. His poetry anthology, So far, was published by HarperCollins in 2000.

Personal life
Da Cunha was married to Uma, a theater and film critic. His younger brother Sylvester was also involved in advertising and English theatre. Gerson da Cunha died from a cardiac arrest in Mumbai on 7 January 2022, at the age of 92.

Works

Books 
So far. HarperCollins (India), 2000. .

Films 
Source(s):

 Electric Moon (1992)
 Cotton Mary (1999)
 Asoka (2001)
 Water (2005)
Rangoon (2017)
Gandhi of the Month (2018)

See also 

 José Gerson da Cunha

References

External links

Decline of a Great City

1929 births
2022 deaths
20th-century Indian journalists
20th-century Indian male actors
Male actors from Goa
Indian male film actors
University of Mumbai alumni
Indian male stage actors
Indian male journalists
Journalists from Goa